The 2012 Safari Sevens are the 17th annual edition of the Safari Sevens.

Tournament administration

Venue
Nyayo National Stadium Off Uhuru Highway Nairobi kenya

Dates
The 2012 Safari Sevens are slated to take place between 1 and 3 June which, if true, would be a switch back to the traditional time of year after the November event of 2011.

Ticketing

Match officials

The 2012 tournament match officials

Men's tournament

Participating Teams

Pool A

Pool B

Pool C

Pool D

Teams unable to attend
Teams slated to attend but later withdrew included:

Pool stages
Results form the pool stages.

Pool A

|}

Pool B

|}

Pool C

|}

Pool D

|}

Knockout stage
Results from the knockout stage.

Cup

Plate

Bowl

Shield

Women's Tournament Result

Round-robin stage

|}

Knockout stage

Men's Veteran Results

Pool stage

Pool 'A'

|}

Pool 'B'

|}

Knockout stage

Boys

Pools

Pool 'A'

|}

Pool 'B'

|}

Knockout stage

Boy's Cup

Boy's Plate

Boy's Bowl

Boy's Shield

Girls

Group stage

Pool 'A'

|}

Pool 'B'

|}

Knockout stage

Girl's Cup

Girl's Plate

Girl's Bowl

Girl's Shield

References

2012
2012 in African rugby union
2012 rugby sevens competitions